Ball Hill Township is a township in Griggs County, North Dakota, United States.

Demographics
Its population during the 2010 census was 55.

Location within Griggs County
Ball Hill Township is located in Township 145 Range 59 west of the Fifth principal meridian.

References

Townships in Griggs County, North Dakota